Nick Parker is an English journalist and chief foreign correspondent of London-based The Sun newspaper. He has covered major breaking news stories across the world as well as domestic stories for The Sun since 1988 and is not to be confused with the CNN reporter of the same name.

His stories include the Piper Alpha disaster, the Lockerbie bombing, both Gulf Wars, the Balkans conflict, the Dunblane massacre, the Kosovo crisis, the return of Great Train Robber Ronald Biggs, 9/11, the Afghan war, the Beslan massacre, the Boxing Day tsunami, Hurricane Katrina, the Darfur crisis, the Israel v Hezbollah war in Lebanon, the Mumbai Massacre, the Haiti earthquake, the invasion of Gaza, the Sousse beach massacre and the Paris terror attacks.  He was also a member of The Sun's reporting team on the 1989 Hillsborough disaster.

In addition, Parker has worked on major sporting events including the London and Beijing Olympics and football World Cups and European Championships.

On 11 February 2012, Parker was arrested by detectives investigating payments to public officials as part of the Metropolitan Police's Operation Elveden. He was subsequently charged with three counts of aiding and abetting misconduct in public office relating to payments made to a police officer and prison officer. He was also charged as part of the Metropolitan Police's Operation Tuleta with receiving a mobile phone belonging to Labour MP Siobhain McDonagh.

After a three-week trial on 9 December 2014, Parker – who argued all his actions were in keeping with Press Complaints Commission Code of Conduct and in the public interest – was found not guilty of all three aiding and abetting misconduct charges but convicted of receiving the mobile phone and sentenced to three months' imprisonment, suspended for 12 months.

The journalist also was responsible for a story in The Sun revolving  around cricket player Ben Stokes's murdered siblings, which drew strong criticism from the cricketer and public at large. Stokes denounced the article, describing The Sun's actions as "low and despicable".

In December 2021, a judge sitting at London's High Court allowed the actress Sienna Miller to read a Statement In Open Court in which she said she believed Parker had paid a private investigator called Christine Hart to illegally obtain her medical records when The Sun was trying to discover whether or not she was pregnant in 2005. Although Ms Miller made the statement after The Sun's publishers News Group Newspapers had paid her a substantial sum to settle a phone-hacking claim out of court, which her lawyers claimed was "tantamount" to an admission of illegality at The Sun, because News Group Newspapers had not actually admitted liability, Mr Justice Fancourt said of the claims in Ms Miller's statement: “It is not to be taken as a statement that illegal activities were being carried on, but that Ms Miller believes that is what was happening.”

In the statement, read by Ms Miller's barrister, David Sherborne QC, he referred to documents relating to Ms Miller which had been provided by The Sun during the disclosure process and said: "Ms Miller was horrified to see the disclosure which she believed showed that there were expenses claimed by Nick Parker, a senior Sun journalist, and that he had met with a 'medical records tracer' in July and August 2005 to discuss Ms Miller's pregnancy. Ms Miller also believes that the medical records tracer was Christine Hart, who is alleged in this litigation to have obtained private medical information, and that she appeared to have issued an invoice for 'Sienns {sic} Miller Pregnant research'." Mr Sherborne went on: "Mr Parker's expenses use the reference 'SIENNA MILLER PREGNANCY RIDDLE' and the last expense state 'DINNER WITH TRACER (WHO CONFIRMED SIENNA WAS PREGNANT)'."

Links to articles about Nick Parker

http://www.theguardian.com/media/2014/dec/14/nick-parker-sun-reporter-conviction-bad-joke
http://www.pressgazette.co.uk/content/conviction-nick-parker-means-mps-expenses-scandal-would-never-be-exposed-if-it-happened
http://www.pressgazette.co.uk/lawyer-nick-parker-case-shows-journalists-treated-more-severely-common-criminals

References

Place of birth missing (living people)
20th-century births
20th-century English non-fiction writers
21st-century English writers
English bloggers
English reporters and correspondents
Living people
The Sun (United Kingdom) people
Year of birth missing (living people)
British male bloggers